Leandro Jorge (born 6 March 1978) is a Mozambican swimmer. He competed in the men's 100 metre backstroke event at the 1996 Summer Olympics.

References

External links
 

1978 births
Living people
Mozambican male backstroke swimmers
Olympic swimmers of Mozambique
Swimmers at the 1996 Summer Olympics
Place of birth missing (living people)